Humbert Lundén (January 7, 1882 – February 5, 1961) was a Swedish sailor who competed in the 1912 Summer Olympics. He was a crew member of the Swedish boat Kitty, which won the gold medal in the ten metre class.

References

External links
profile

1882 births
1961 deaths
Swedish male sailors (sport)
Sailors at the 1912 Summer Olympics – 10 Metre
Olympic sailors of Sweden
Olympic gold medalists for Sweden
Olympic medalists in sailing
Medalists at the 1912 Summer Olympics
20th-century Swedish people